Timothy Wonnacott (born 12 March 1951) is an English chartered auctioneer, chartered surveyor, antiques expert, narrator, and a television presenter. He was previously a director of Sotheby's, one of the world's oldest auction houses.

He is best known for having presented the BBC daytime programme Bargain Hunt from 2003 until 2015, and has been the narrator of Antiques Road Trip since it began in 2010.

Education
Wonnacott was educated at the independent West Buckland School in Devon; after qualifying as a chartered auctioneer and chartered surveyor, he took a postgraduate course at the Victoria and Albert Museum in fine and decorative arts.

Professional career
Wonnacott's ambition was to follow in the footsteps of his father, Major Raymond Wonnacott, an auctioneer in South West England.

Wonnacott joined Sotheby's in 1978, becoming a full Director in 1985. He was appointed sole chairman of Sotheby's South, based at Billingshurst in Sussex and at Sotheby's saleroom in Olympia, London.

In January 2003, he left Sotheby's after 25 years, in order to concentrate on his media activities. He started the fine art agency and brokerage business Tim Wonnacott & Associates. The business is designed to provide independent advice to both buyers and sellers of antiques.

Wonnacott has helped raise money for many charities at auction, including the 'Cow Parade' auctions in London and the Isle of Man (the former featuring the prize cow ‘big Kez’),[9] the sale of statues of Gromit in Bristol in 2013, and the sale of statues of Shaun the Sheep in Bristol in 2015. In October 2007, he took part in what was then believed to be the world's largest public art auction, when 63 fibreglass cows were put up for sale outside Manchester Town Hall. Proceeds were to be donated to a local charity, Manchester Kids.

He is a fellow of the Royal Institution of Chartered Surveyors.

Television
In July 2003, Wonnacott replaced David Dickinson as the daytime host of the popular BBC One television programme Bargain Hunt. The original contract was for 30 shows, but this was extended to over 350 shows in the light of his appeal to viewers.

Wonnacott is currently the narrator of BBC TV's Antiques Road Trip and Celebrity Antiques Road Trip. The programmes' format involves two experts (and, in the celebrity version, two celebrities as well) driving around the country in a classic car visiting antique shops and buying objects out of a starting budget of £200. The items that are purchased are sold by auction at the end of each episode; the resulting profits or losses are rolled over until the road trip comes to an end—usually after five days—when the person with the most money is deemed the winner. In the celebrity version, only one auction is featured and there is no roll-over.

His other TV appearances include BBC One's Restoration, The Divine Michelangelo, Test the Nation, Ready, Steady, Cook, This Morning, Top Gear, Going, Going, Gone, Going for a Song, Light Lunch, The Antiques Show, Put Your Money Where Your Mouth Is, The Great Antiques Hunt, Buried Treasures, and Royal Upstairs Downstairs.

On 29 August 2014, Wonnacott was announced as a contestant on the twelfth series of Strictly Come Dancing. He was partnered with Australian dancer Natalie Lowe. The couple were eliminated in week 4, after dancing the paso doble, in favour of Mark Wright and Karen Hauer staying in the competition. After being eliminated, Tim reflected: "It’s a great treat to be on a programme like Strictly. For an old geezer like me, who comes along in his 64th year and he’s slightly portly, and he thinks he’s a bit over the hill, this last month, with this delightful teacher, has taken me to a very special place".

On 16 September 2015, it was reported that he was no longer to host Bargain Hunt for personal reasons, after an alleged disagreement with producers.

Personal life
Wonnacott was born in Barnstaple, north Devon, England, the younger son of local auctioneer Major Raymond Wonnacott and his wife Pamela Frog. He was brought up in Devon. His elder brother Paul died in the late 1960s. 

He married Helen (born August 1956) in 1984; they have three children. He ran Sotheby's operations in North West England when he lived in Cheshire.

References

External links
Official website

Living people
1951 births
People from Barnstaple
Antiques experts
English television presenters
People educated at West Buckland School
English television personalities
English businesspeople
Fellows of the Royal Institution of Chartered Surveyors